Satu Marianne Pauri (née Ruotsalainen; born 21 October 1966 in Oulu) is a retired Finnish heptathlete.

Pauri finished fourth at the 1991 World Championships, where she broke the national record with 6404 points.

Achievements

External links 
 

1966 births
Living people
Sportspeople from Oulu
Finnish heptathletes
Olympic athletes of Finland
Athletes (track and field) at the 1988 Summer Olympics
Athletes (track and field) at the 1992 Summer Olympics